What Did You Think Was Going to Happen? is the debut studio album from Los Angeles band 2AM Club. It was released September 14, 2010 by RCA Records.

Critical reception

Matt Collar of AllMusic stated that with this album "2AM Club reveal themselves as the best and brightest of the nu-eyed-soul set".

Track listing

On May 31, the band released a song named "Baseline" that was a bonus track on What Did You Think Was Going to Happen? (sold on iTunes).  It was advertised by them via Twitter, and was available for free download through a file sharing website, Hulk Share.

Charts

References

2010 albums
Pop rock albums by American artists